Tactical Manager is a football management simulator video game for the Amiga, Atari ST, and DOS platforms. It was developed by Camy Maertens of the then-defunct Essex-based UK developer Talking Birds and published by Black Legend Software in 1994.

Gameplay
Tactical Manager is a football management simulator that allows one to 46 players to play simultaneously. There are no set goals, but the aim is to manage a football team to be as successful as possible. To achieve this the player can pick the team, set tactics and buy and sell players.

Reception
Tactical Manager received mixed reviews. CU Amiga magazine rated the game 87%, calling it "Extremely involving", while Amiga User International magazine rated it 45% and said that the game looks dated when compared to other management games available. Later on a new game called Tactical Manager 2 was released.

References 

1994 video games
Amiga games
Atari ST games
DOS games
Association football management video games
Video games developed in the United Kingdom